Murder Rooms: Mysteries of the Real Sherlock Holmes is a television crime drama series created by David Pirie, and co-produced by the BBC and WGBH Boston, a PBS station. Six episodes were made and were first broadcast on BBC Two, the first two on 4 and 5 January 2000, and the other four from 4 September to 2 October 2001.

Plot
The series follows Sir Arthur Conan Doyle's time as a general practitioner in Southsea, solving mysteries with the help of his mentor, Dr Joseph Bell, who is based in Edinburgh. The series stars Ian Richardson as Dr Joseph Bell, alongside Robin Laing and later Charles Edwards as Sir Arthur Conan Doyle.

Cast
 Robin Laing as Sir Arthur Conan Doyle (in "The Dark Beginnings of Sherlock Holmes" only)
 Charles Edwards as Sir Arthur Conan Doyle (in the remaining four episodes)
 Ian Richardson as Dr Joseph Bell
 Simon Chandler as Inspector Warner
 Mossie Smith as Mrs Williams
 Ben Macleod as Innes Doyle
 Dolly Wells as Elspeth Scott
 Charles Dance as Sir Henry Carlyle

Production

Development
The series was inspired by Sir Arthur Conan Doyle's choice to base the character of Sherlock Holmes on Dr Joseph Bell, who had been his tutor at the University of Edinburgh and occasionally worked as a forensic expert for the Edinburgh Police. The series exaggerated the similarities between Bell and Holmes for dramatic effect, with Doyle acting much as Doctor Watson acts in Doyle's stories, and included several scenes from the books, the implication being that these inspire Doyle's fiction.

Writing
One of the most notable references to Sherlock Holmes is a version of a scene in The Sign of Four in which Holmes deduces that a pocket watch provided by Watson was formerly owned by a drunkard, upon which a furious Watson believes that Holmes has callously acquired information about his unfortunate brother, to whom the watch had belonged, for the sake of a cheap trick. The series' version of the scene has Bell deduce the mental state of Doyle's father, inspiring much the same reaction. (This scene also appears in the otherwise unrelated drama The Strange Case of Arthur Conan Doyle, also by David Pirie.)

David Pirie also wrote three novels related to the series: The Patient's Eyes, The Night Calls and The Dark Water.

Filming
The series was filmed in Scotland and Cromer, Norfolk.

Casting
Ian Richardson had earlier played Sherlock Holmes in television adaptations of The Hound of the Baskervilles and The Sign of Four.

Episodes

Pilot (2000)
The pilot, also sometimes referred to as a "Christmas Special", was first broadcast in two parts on BBC Two. On 24 March 2003 the pilot was released on a DVD on which the two parts were edited into a single 100-minute film, removing more than 20 minutes of footage from the original broadcast. The U.S. release of the DVD, for which the series was retitled Dr. Bell and Mr. Doyle, followed in 2006. It retains the original two-part format.

Series (2001)
After the pilot was critically acclaimed a series of four episodes was commissioned for BBC One. Although the response was initially positive, viewing figures quickly declined and the final episode of the series drew fewer than three million viewers. These episodes were released on DVD on 16 January 2012, but many fans criticised the decision to reduce the original 16:9 picture ratio to 4:3. The U.S. release, which first circulated in 2006, retains the original 16:9 picture format.

Reception and cancellation
The series was produced by BBC Films, rather than the drama division. Following the conclusion of the four-episode series the decision was made not to recommission the series despite the critical acclaim for it. One BBC insider wryly commented that it was "too successful for the wrong department".

References

External links
Murder Rooms website

BBC television dramas
Sherlock Holmes television series
Edinburgh in fiction
Arthur Conan Doyle
2000 British television series debuts
2001 British television series endings
Films shot in Edinburgh
2000s British drama television series
2000s British mystery television series